Diethyl oxomalonate is the diethyl ester of mesoxalic acid (ketomalonic acid), the simplest oxodicarboxylic acid and thus the first member (n = 0) of a homologous series HOOC–CO–(CH2)n–COOH with the higher homologues oxalacetic acid (n = 1), α-ketoglutaric acid (n = 2) and α-ketoadipic acid (n = 3) (the latter a metabolite of the amino acid lysine). Diethyl oxomalonate reacts because of its highly polarized keto group as electrophile in addition reactions and is a highly active reactant in pericyclic reactions such as the Diels-Alder reactions, cycloadditions or ene reactions. At humid air, mesoxalic acid diethyl ester reacts with water to give diethyl mesoxalate hydrate and the green-yellow oil are spontaneously converted to white crystals.

Production and occurrence 
In 1892, Richard Anschütz and co-workers synthesized for the first time diethyl oxomalonate (“Oxomalonsäureäthylester”) in pure form, starting from decomposition of the barium salt of alloxan to oxomalonic acid followed by esterification with ethanol in the presence of hydrogen chloride.

Louis Bouveault and co-workers obtained by the nitrosation of diethyl malonate its isonitrosoester, which was oxidized to diethyl oxomalonate with dinitrogen tetroxide N2O4 ("peroxyde d'azote"). The keto compound, obtained as oil, reacts with water to give the crystalline dihydrate.

In a modified variant of the synthesis with N2O4, diethyl oxomalonate was obtained in 90% crude yield. Instead of dinitrogen tetroxide, dinitrogen trioxide N2O3 (obtained from arsenic(III)oxide with nitric acid) can also be used as the oxidant. The overall yield is 74–76%. However, the synthetic route is complex in terms of apparatus and unsuitable due to the toxicity and carcinogenicity of As2O3. The oxidation of malonic ester with selenium dioxide (SeO2) has an unsatisfactorily yield of ester hydrate of only 23%, just like the "improved synthesis" reaction via the malonate dibromide and bromide elimination with potassium acetate with a yield of 41–47%.

Several processes for the preparation of diethyl oxomalonate use the oxidation of diethyl malonate or its enamines with oxygen or ozone. Thus, the ozonolysis of diethylethylidenmalonate (from malonate and methanal in about 80% yield) at −78 °C only 62% diethyl oxomalonate, the electrochemical oxidation of cyanmalonic acid diethylester (from cyanoacetate and chloroacetic acid ethyl ester using oxygen in 77% yield) the last oxidation stage and the ozonolysis of dialkylbenzalmalonates reported by Lutz Friedjan Tietze using the dimethyl ester as an example yield 76% dimethyl mesoxalate.

Ozonolysis is essentially limited to the laboratory scale (up to about 150 g of product) because of the risks of handling ozone.

The enamine product from dimethylformamide-dimethylacetal reacts by photooxidation in virtually quantitative yield to diethyl oxomalonate-hydrate. A more recent patent describes the synthesis of diethyl oxomalonate from the simple precursor diethyl malonate by oxidation with aqueous sodium chlorite (NaClO2) solution at pH 4.4 in 97% yield.

The ester is first produced as a hydrate, which is dehydrated by azeotropic distillation with toluene to the final product.

Properties 
Diethyl oxomalonate is a greenish-yellow, low-viscosity, low-odor oil that rapidly forms the dihydrate and crystallizes with water in shape of white prisms. The refractive index is 1.425 (20 °C, 589 nm) to 1.4310 (22 °C, 589 nm).

Application 
Diethyl oxomalonate acts as electron-poor dienophile and can be used as a carbon dioxide equivalent for Diels-Alder reactions with electron-rich 1,3-dienes such as isoprenes or dimethyl butadienes in a [4+2]cycloaddition to the geminal dihydropyran diester. This diester can be hydrolyzed in the alkaline to gem-diacid, halogenated with oxalyl chloride to gem-diacid chloride, with sodium azide transferred to the gem-diacid azide finally degraded in a Curtius Rearrangement to a dihydropyranone.

Diethyl oxomalonate reacts in an aldol addition with the morpholinenamine of 3-pentanone to form an α-hydroxy-γ-ketodiester. This ketodiester forms a substituted butenolide with a phosphorus pentoxide/methanesulfonic acid mixture.

With guanidines, a functionalized imidazolone is produced in 85% yield.

Diethyl oxomalonate is a versatile reactant in the Baylis-Hillman reaction and forms the corresponding multifunctional compounds with acrylates, acrylonitrile, or methyl vinyl ketone catalysed by DABCO.

Diethyl oxomalonate reacts with the Grignard compound formed from 1-iodo-2-chloromethylbenzene and isopropylmagnesium chloride to give 2-bis-carboxyethyl-isobenzofuran.

Diethyl oxomalonate is added to terminal double bonds of alkenes in an ene reaction to give 1-hydroxy-1-alkylmalonic esters.

References 

Ketoesters
Ethyl esters